Nick Montfort is a poet and professor of digital media at MIT, where he directs a lab called The Trope Tank. He also holds a part-time position at the University of Bergen where he leads a node on computational narrative systems at the Center for Digital Narrative. Among his publications are seven books of computer-generated literature and six books from the MIT Press, several of which are collaborations. His work also includes digital projects, many of them in the form of short programs. He lives in New York City.

Computer-generated books 
Montfort's The Truelist (Counterpath, 2017) is a computer-generated book-length poem produced by a one-page computer program. The code is included at the end of the book. Montfort has also done a complete studio recording reading The Truelist, available at PennSound.

Among Montfort's computer-generated books is #! (pronounced "shebang"), in which he "chooses the programming languages Python, Ruby, and Perl (the last of which has a documented history as a poetic medium) to create impressions of an ideal—machines based on the rules of language." The book includes a Python version of "Taroko Gorge," which is available online in JavaScript and has been modified by many authors. Some of these "remixes" are collected in The Electronic Literature Collection: Volume 3.

Montfort collaborated with six others on 2x6, a book published by Les Figues that includes six short programs and some of the short narrative poems these generate in English, Spanish, French, Polish, Japanese, and Russian. This project has also been exhibited and is available online on the Web. Montfort's Autopia, which assembles short sentences from the names of automobiles, is another project that also appears as a printed book (published by Troll Thread), a gallery installation, and a web page. These and other of his computer-generated books have been considered conceptual writing.

Several of Montfort's printed computer-generated books were generated with programs he wrote during National Novel Generation Month (NaNoGenMo). These include three self-published books, Hard West Turn (2018 Edition), Megawatt, and World Clock, written during the first NaNoGenMo in 2014. Translations of two of these were published by presses in Europe: World Clock was published in Polish translation by ha!art, and Megawatt in German translation by Frohmann.

Montfort is the founder and series editor of Using Electricity, a series of computer-generated books published by Counterpath.

In November 2019 Montfort announced "Nano-NaNoGenMo," calling for short computer programs within that year's National Novel Generation Month. His request was that people write programs of 256 characters or less to generate novels of 50,000 words or more. He contributed several such programs himself, as did several others.

Poetry 
Montfort's poetry, in addition to computer-generated books and projects, includes digital poems that are collaborations with others. He, Amaranth Borsuk and Jesper Juul wrote The Deletionist, a system for generating erasure poetry from any page on the web. With Stephanie Strickland he wrote Sea and Spar Between, a generator of about 225 trillion stanzas arranged in a grid and combining language from Herman Melville Moby Dick and Emily Dickison's poems. Montfort and William Gillespie wrote 2002: A Palindrome Story, a 2002-word narrative palindrome published in 2002 in print and on the web.

Riddle & Bind (Spineless Books, 2010), Montfort's first book of poetry, is a collection of poems written under constraint and literary riddles.

Interactive fiction 
Montfort has written about interactive fiction and written several interactive fiction games. Book and Volume (2005) was a finalist in the 2007 Slamdance Guerilla Gamemaker Competition. However, after Super Columbine Massacre RPG!, which had also been named a finalist, was excluded from the festival, Montfort withdrew from the competition in protest.

Released in 2000, Ad Verbum is a wordplay-based game in which the player has to figure out stylistic constraints in different locations and type certain commands in order to solve puzzles. It received the 2000 XYZZY Award for Best Puzzles.

Twisty Little Passages: An Approach to Interactive Fiction, a 2003 book, was described by Steve Meretzky as "a thoroughly researched history of interactive fiction, as well as a brilliant analysis of the genre."

Writing on digital media 
The group blog Grand Text Auto, active in the early 2000s, was one site where Montfort wrote with others about digital media. Montfort wrote Twisty Little Passages: An Approach to Interactive Fiction (MIT Press, 2003) and co-edited The Electronic Literature Collection: Volume 1 (ELO, 2006) and The New Media Reader (MIT Press, 2003) during that time.

Montfort and Georgia Institute of Technology professor Ian Bogost wrote Racing the Beam: The Atari Video Computer System (MIT Press, 2009), a study of world's first widespread gaming system, the Atari 2600. Racing the Beam. In the book, they analyze the platforms, or systems, that underlie the computing process. They also discuss the social and cultural implications of the system that dominated the video game market. In 2012 he and nine co-authors published a book about a one-liner program for the Commodore 64.

His most recent book is The Future (MIT Press, 2017). A futures studies reviewer describes The Future as "written by an outsider to the foresight community" who "examines the works of artists, inventors, and designers and how they have imagined the future." The book was reviewed as "striking a balance between planning and poetry ... a sober, tight account of what 'the future' is and has been, as well as how to think and make it."

Works

Poetry
 The Truelist (2017), also in print, Counterpath
 Autopia (2016), also in print, Troll Thread
 2x6 (collaboration with six others, 2016), also in print, Les Figues
 Taroko Gorge (2009)
 Ream/Rame (collaboration with Anick Bergeron, 2008)
 2002: A Palindrome Story (collaboration with William Gillespie, 2002), also in print, Spineless Books

Prose
 Grand Text Auto group blog
Book and Volume (2005)
 Implementation (collaboration with Scott Rettberg, 2004)
 Ad Verbum (2000)
 Winchester's Nightmare (1999)

In print
Montfort, Nick (2017). The Future. Cambridge, MA: MIT Press.
Montfort, Nick (2016). Exploratory Programming for the Arts and Humanities. Cambridge, MA: MIT Press.

Montfort, Nick, and Ian Bogost (2009). Racing the Beam: The Atari Video Computer System. Cambridge, MA: MIT Press.

References

External links
 Nick Montfort's personal website
 Grand Text Auto Blog
 Taroko Gorge Remixes
 Ad Verbum

20th-century births
Living people
American computer scientists
American mass media scholars
Interactive fiction writers
Electronic literature writers
Video game researchers
Digital media educators
Massachusetts Institute of Technology faculty
Year of birth missing (living people)
Academic staff of the University of Bergen